Sir John Mundy (died 1537) was a member of the Worshipful Company of Goldsmiths and was Lord Mayor of London in 1522.

Career
John Mundy was born in High Wycombe, Buckinghamshire, the son of Sir John Mundy and Isabel Ripes. In 1515 Mundy served as a Sheriff of London. In 1522 he became Lord Mayor of London. He was knighted by King Henry VIII in 1529 (some say 1523).

In 1516 he purchased from Lord Audley the manors of Markeaton, Mackworth and Allestree, all now part of the city of Derby.

He built a Tudor House and his descendants replaced the old manor house with a new mansion in about 1750 Markeaton Hall.

Sir John Mundy was buried in the church of St Peter, Westcheap in the City of London.

Marriages and children
Mundy married twice, firstly to a lady named Margaret Cermiechell. His second marriage was to Juliana Browne (died 1537), the daughter of his mayoral predecessor, Sir William Browne (died 1514), and the granddaughter of two mayors, Sir John Browne and Sir Edmund Shaa. By Juliana, Mundy had five sons and four daughters.

Sons
Vincent Mundy of Markeaton, his heir.
George Mundy of Markeaton, who died childless.
Christopher Mundy of Markeaton, who died childless.
Thomas Mundy of Markeaton alias Wandsworth, the last Prior of Bodmin Priory. Before the Dissolution of Bodmin in 1539 Prior Thomas granted favourable long leases on most of the priory's possessions to his friends and relatives, including Rialton to his brother John Mundy and Padstow to his niece Joanna Prideaux. 
John Mundy of Markeaton and Rialton, Cornwall. He was admitted to the Middle Temple and married Joan Way, by whom he had children including:
Katherine Mundy, who married Lawrence Kendall, esquire, of Withiel, Cornwall.
Joanna Mundy, wife of William Prideaux (died 1564) of Trevose, St Merryn, Cornwall, who on 20 October 1537 received a 99-year lease of the manor of Padstow from Thomas Munday, the last Prior of Bodmin. William's nephew Sir Nicholas Prideaux (1550–1627), MP, built Prideaux Place in 1592 within the manor of Padstow.

Daughters
Margaret Mundy of Markeaton, who married firstly Nicholas Jennings, a member of the Worshipful Company of Skinners and a Sheriff and Alderman of the City of London; secondly, as his third wife, Edmund Howard, Lord Deputy of Calais, younger son of the Duke of Norfolk and therefore became stepmother to Queen Katherine Howard, fifth wife of King Henry VIII by whom she had no children; and thirdly Henry Mannox. Although Steinman conjectured that Margaret Mundy's third husband was the Henry Mannox, executed in 1541, who had been music master to Katherine Howard in her youth, and had been involved in sexual indiscretions with her which later contributed to her downfall, Bindoff established that Margaret Mundy's third husband, Henry Mannox, made his will on 18 March 1564, in which he disinherited both Margaret and his son. Margaret (née Mundy) was buried at Streatham, Surrey, on 22 January 1565.
Mildred Mundy of Markeaton, who married, by dispensation dated 27 June 1538, Sir John Harleston (18 May 1511 – 28 February 1569) of South Ockendon, Essex.
Elizabeth Mundy of Markeaton, who married Sir John Tyrrell (died 1574) son of James Tyrrell of Gipping, Suffolk. She is best known for allegedly confessing to the murders of the Princes in the Tower under Richard of York's orders.
Anne Mundy of Markeaton, who married Thomas Darcy (c. 1511 – 1557) of Tolleshunt Darcy, Essex.

Notes

References

External links
Will of Sir John Mundy, goldsmith and alderman of London, proved 26 September 1537, PROB 11/27/118, National Archives. Retrieved 7 July 2013
Will of Dame Julian Mundy, widow, proved 26 September 1537, PROB 11/27/117, National Archives. Retrieved 7 July 2013
Will of Vincent Mundy of Islington, Middlesex , proved 23 October 1573, PROB 11/55/413, National Archives. Retrieved 7 July 2013
Will of Sir John Tyrrell of Gipping, Suffolk, proved 22 June 1574, PROB 11/56/322, National Archives. Retrieved 7 July 2013
Mannock, Henry (by 1526–64), of London; Haddenham, Cambridgeshire; and Hemingford Grey, Huntingdonshire, History of Parliament. Retrieved 7 July 2013
The Mundy Arms, Mackworth. Retrieved 7 July 2013

Year of birth unknown
1537 deaths
16th-century lord mayors of London
Knights Bachelor
People from High Wycombe
People from Markeaton
Sheriffs of the City of London